Benoît Paire defeated defending champion Pablo Andújar in the final, 6–2, 6–3, to win the singles tennis title at the 2019 Grand Prix Hassan II. The win earned Paire his second career Association of Tennis Professionals (ATP) singles title, his first in four years. Andújar saw his 13-match winning streak snapped in the loss after he had won two consecutive ATP Challenger Tour titles in Marbella and Alicante in the two weeks prior to the tournament.

Seeds

Draw

Finals

Top half

Bottom half

Qualifying

Seeds

Qualifiers

Lucky loser
  Carlos Berlocq

Qualifying draw

First qualifier

Second qualifier

Third qualifier

Fourth qualifier

References

External Links
 Main draw
 Qualifying draw

2019 Grand Prix Hassan II